GNZ48 is a Chinese idol girl group established in Guangzhou, Guangdong in 2016. It is a sister group of SNH48, belonging to Guangzhou Star48 Culture Media Group Co., Ltd. GNZ48 currently has  members ( regular members and  trainees, information reference from GNZ48 official website.) and is divided into Team G, Team NIII and Team Z. Like SNH48, they follow the AKB48's creator Yasushi Akimoto's concept of "idols you can meet".

Overview
GNZ48 is one of the first two sister groups of SNH48 (the other is BEJ48). On April 20, 2016, Star48 Media held a press conference in Beijing to announce the establishment of the SNH48 sister groups BEJ48 and GNZ48, and launched the first phase of the GNZ48 recruitment campaign. GNZ48 officially became a girl idol group. GNZ48 is a girl idol group that conducts performing arts activities in Guangzhou which built on the “idols you can meet” concept by regularly organizing “handshake” events where fans can meet group members. Its theater is located at Zhongtai International Plaza in Tianhe District, Guangzhou, and opened on April 29, 2016. Its name is the abbreviation of "Guangzhou" Pinyin name. Its first members included some fifth- and sixth-generation members transferred from SNH48.

When GNZ48 was established, there were two teams, the Team G and Team NIII. Since GNZ48 is a sister group established by SNH48 brokerage company Star48, AKB48 operator AKS has not directly authorized SNH48, so GNZ48 is not included in the AKB48 Group (AKB48 issued a statement on June 9, 2016, that said that GNZ48 has nothing to do with AKB48, nor does it belong to AKB48 Group. The English name of the Team G and the Team NIII are not named in the order of the AKB48 group, but are directly named Team G and Team NIII. Team Z consists of 18 first-generation members of GNZ48, which was established on October 23, 2016.

History

2016

On April 20, 2016, Star48 announced the establishment of SNH48's two sister groups, BEJ48 and GNZ48. At the same time, it started holding auditions for first-generation members. The GNZ48 Theatre opened on April 29, with Team Gnz holding its first performance of its 1st Stage, "Theater no Megami". Team NIII held its first performance of its 1st Stage, "Boku no Taiyou" on May 6.

On April 29, the special theater "GNZ48 Star Dream Theater"(Chinese:GNZ48 星梦剧院) officially opened; On the same day, Team G held the premiere of "Theatrical Goddess" performance.

On April 30, Team NIII premiered "My Sun"(Chinese:我的太阳) performance.

On July 13, GNZ48 started their School Tour, similar in format to SNH48's School Tour.

On August 26, they held the "Love Music Wing Up" GNZ48 Dream Departure (Chinese:“爱音乐 翼起来”GNZ48梦想启航)Show Case Concert at Sun Yat-sen Memorial Hall.

On September 19, they released their debut EP, You Don't Know Me (Chinese:你所不知道的我).

On October 1st, Huang Lirong and Xiang Yun were added to Team G, and Zeng Aijia and Gao Yuanjing were appointed captain and vice-captain respectively.

On October 2nd, Team NIII published the following on the special performance of National Day:

Dai Xinyi and Li Yihong were upgraded to members of Team NIII.

Liu Lifei was appointed as the first team leader of Team NIII and Liu Qianqian as the vice captain.

On October 14, Team G premiered the "Heart of the Heart"(Chinese:心的旅程) performance.

On October 23, 18 first-generation members assigned to Team Z were announced.

On November 1, auditions were held for SNH48 eighth-generation members, BEJ48 second-generation members, GNZ48 second-generation members and SHY48 second-generation members.

On November 18, Team Z premieres the "Exclusive Party"(Chinese:专属派对) performance.

2017

On January 16, 2017, GNZ48 released their 2nd EP, BOOM! BOOM! BOOM!.

On March 24, Team NIII began its second stage, "First Person"(Chinese:第1人称).

On April 8, they held the "GNZ48 Fan Culture Festival"(Chinese:GNZ48粉丝文化祭).

On April 13, they released their 3rd EP, I.F.

On April 20, they held auditions for BEJ48, GNZ48 and SHY48 third-generation members.

On April 29, they announced 14 second-generation members during GNZ48's first anniversary.

On July 28, GNZ48 released their first documentary, Documentary of GNZ48: 7/48 (GNZ48 四十八分之七).

On July 29, GNZ48, along with SNH48, BEJ48, SHY48 and CKG48, held auditions for SNH48 ninth-generation, BEJ48, GNZ48 and SHY48 fourth-generation and CKG48 second-generation members.

On August 11, Team G began its third stage, "Two-Faced Idol"(Chinese:双面偶像).

On September 15, Team Z premiered the performance of "Code, The west of LinHe"(Chinese:代号·林和西).

On September 16, Team Z announced Nong Yanping as captain and Long Yirui as Vice-Captain; they also announced that the team's stage “Trigonometric function”(Chinese:三角函数) will be held at the end of the year.

On September 23, they released their 4th EP, Say No. The title track's lyrics were written by members Feng Jiaxi and Luo Hanyue, and its music video was done as a collaboration with the Guangdong Southern Tigers.

On October 1, GNZ48 3rd Generation trainee premiered the "Idol Research Program"(Chinese:偶像研究计划) performance.

On October 30, GNZ48 and China Merchants Bank issued the 2017 Idol Annual Popularity Final Selection GNZ48 TOP3 members Liu Lifei, Xie Leilei, Zheng Danni Idol exclusive small idol savings card.

On November 23, six fourth-generation members were announced.

On December 3, GNZ48 combined with SNH48, BEJ48, SHY48, CKG48 began to recruit SNH48 ten-year students, BEJ48 five-year students, GNZ48 five-year students, SHY48 five-year students, CKG48 three-stage students.

On December 24, in conjunction with the SNH48 Group, the fifth EP "不见不散" was issued.

2018

On January 12, 2018, Team Z premiered the "Trigonometric Function"(Chinese:三角函数) performance.

On March 28, in conjunction with the SNH48 Group, the 6th EP "抱紧处理" was issued.

On April 2, the Wolf Man killed the marathon in the SNH48 Group's exclusive Werewolf app "48 Werewolf Kill"(Chinese:48狼人杀).

From April 6 to 8, the GNZ48 debut two-year anniversary photo album "你所不知道的…" is also the first GNZ48 photo book.

From April 27 to 30, together with BEJ48 in the SNH48 Group's exclusive werewolf killing APP "48 Werewolf Kill"(Chinese:48狼人杀) held the "悠点泰度" large werewolf marathon competition, more than 100 members took turns in 48 days of marathon in 4 days Live match.

On April 29, the following issues were announced on the second anniversary of the theater:

Published and announced six five-phase generation;

Zeng Aijia and Gao Yuanjing resigned as team cap and vice captain of Team G, and Luo Hanyue took over, and the vice captain was to be determined;

Announced a new original performance "Miss.", Team G's "Victoria.G", Team NIII's "Fiona.N", Team Z's "Mia.Z".

On May 14, the GNZ48 operation announcement was announced. Since the recent behavior of GNZ48 member Zhu Yixin deviated from the basic idol image and spirit, it was decided that Zhu Yixin would be reduced to GNZ48 Trainee from now on.

On June 17, the recruitment of six-generation members began.

On June 29, SNH48 Group's operator Shanghai Siba Culture Media Group Co., Ltd. officially announced that it will open the first large-scale idol artist recruitment in the whole group to further promote the cultivation of new generation of high quality idols. The recruitment includes the recruitment of SNH48 Group members, Siba Media Group idol trainees (Korean model trainees) and Mina actor studio (film and television performers), not limited to men and women, selected players will receive professional artist training at home and abroad.

On July 6, Team NIII premiered the performance of "Fiona.N".

On July 20, the "double-sided idol: again and again"(Chinese:双面偶像：又又). stage performance performance was officially launched!

On October 5, the following issues were published on the special performance of the Trainee "Idol Research Project":

Announced the release of four six-generation memberss;

Prepared to be born in Fu Bingbing, Luo Kejia, Lin Zhi, and Xu Jiayin as members of Team G.

On October 6, GNZ48 TOP16 members held the “PVC Sisters Love” tour in Vientiane World Shenzhen.

On October 16, ex-member Du Yuwei committed suicide at the age of 19.

Members
, Information reference from GNZ48 official website.

Team G
 The current captain is Huang Chuyin, and the vice captain is Luo Kejia.

Team NIII
 The current captain is Wu Yufei and the vice captain is Liu Lifei.

Team Z
 The current captain is Long Yirui and the vice captain is Ma Xinyue.

Trainee

Members on hiatus
 Regular members who are unable to continue to participate in the SNH48 group due to academic, physical, contractual or personal reasons will be counted as temporary members. These members also include the ones who claimed as non-members that yet to be removed from the list of members.

Former members

Graduated members

Transferred members

Former trainees 
 Cheng Ziyu ( in Changsha, Hunan) transferred to IDOLS Ft on January 19, 2019
 Men Xiutian ( in Qingdao, Shandong) transferred to IDOLS Ft on January 19, 2019
 Shu Xiang ( in Chengdu, Sichuan) transferred to IDOLS Ft on January 19, 2019
 Yan Yudie ( in Chongqing) graduated on January 19, 2019, and joined IDOLS Ft on March 11, 2019
 Zhang Zeting ( in Shenzhen, Guangdong) transferred to IDOLS Ft on January 19, 2019
 Zhang Ziying ( in Yangjiang, Guangdong) transferred to IDOLS Ft on January 19, 2019

Discography

EP

Published album

Other songs

Concerts

Show

Notework Program 
 China

Variety shows 
 South Korea

Radio program 
China

Collective endorsements and promotional products 
China

Performance 

Team G

Team NIII

Team Z

Trainee

Performance of other locations 
Team G

Team NIII

Team Z

Awards and nominations

Notable and controversial incidents
During the October 1 National Day show in 2016 in Guangzhou, GNZ48 members performed "Me and My Motherland" (我和我的祖国), and were criticized for singing out of tune, out of sync and even forgetting the lyrics. This could be possibly attributed to lack of preparation or lack of sleep. Since then, it was featured in all the subsequent National Day stage shows.

Notes

References

External links 
  
 
 
 

2016 establishments in China
Chinese girl groups
Chinese pop music groups
Musical groups established in 2016
Musical groups from Guangzhou
SNH48 Group